USRC Scammel or sometimes referred to as Scammel II was a Revenue Cutter built in 1798 to serve in the Quasi-War with France. After completion she was transferred to the U.S. Navy and served in the West Indies naval squadron commanded by Commodore John Barry. She assisted the sloop  in the capture of the French ship Hussar. After the war, the Navy retained Scammel until it was sold in 1801.

References 

Ships of the United States Revenue Cutter Service
1798 ships